Dinu Plîngău (born 13 Apil 1994) is a Moldovan politician. He served as Member of the Parliament of Moldova from 2019 until 2021.

References 

Living people
Moldovan MPs 2019–2023
Year of birth missing (living people)